Antidote was a punk rock band from the Netherlands, formed in 1996. The band released several records and toured extensively in Europe, North America, and Russia with prominent US punk bands such as The Casualties and   The Virus. In December 2012, the band officially announced their break-up.  In 2017, the band reunited for a series of festival performances.  Bart and Arne, members of Antidote, have been active with the Utrecht-based punk band Bakfietsboys.

Discography

Studio albums (LP/CD)
No communication LP/CD 2007 Dirty Faces (LP/CD), Rodent Popsicle Records (LP/CD), Neuroempire Records (CD)
Another Dose LP/CD 2006 Dirty Faces (LP/CD), Rodent Popsicle Records (CD), Neuroempire Records (CD), SOS Records (CD)
Back in Year Zero LP/CD 2003 Dirty Faces, 2005 Neuroempire Records, 2006 Rodent Popsicle Records
Go Pogo! 10"/LP/CD 2000 Dirty Faces (10"/LP/CD), 2001 Charged Records (LP/CD), 2005 Neuroempire Records (CD)
"My Life!" LP/CD 1999 Charged Records (LP/CD), 2001 Dirty Faces (pic LP/CD), 2005 Neuroempire Records (CD)

EPs (7")
De Blauwe Moet Blijven 7", 2000, Injection Records
Let's Get Drunk 7", 1998 Injection Records, 2001, Dirty Faces (pic 7")
Bounce the Bouncer 7", 1997 Injection Records

Demo
1997 s/t demotape

Split EPs (7")
split with Seein Red, 2004 Attack Records
split with NY-Relx, 2002 Dirty Faces
"Keine Arbeit" split with The Shocks and Die Strohsäcke, 2000, Attack Records
split met Worhäts, 1999 Attack Records

Compilations (incomplete)
10 Jahre Attack Records 7", 2004, Attack Records
Human Dust Punk/HC compilation 7", 1999, Na Und Records
Internationally Yours compilation 7", 1999, Ditchdiggin Records
Punx Unite 2 compilation LP/CD, 2000, Charged Records
Punk and Disoi!rderly compilation, 2001, Step One Music

External links 
 Antidote website
 Antidote's page on Charged Records

References

Dutch punk rock groups
Musical groups from Utrecht (city)
Musical groups from Amsterdam
Musical groups from Rotterdam
Musical groups established in 1996